Escallonia myrtilloides is an evergreen shrub or tree in the Escalloniaceae family, native to open montane wet forests and paramos from Costa Rica to Bolivia.

Description

Distribution and habitat
The species is found in high Andean wet forests, open areas and paramos, and is often dominant on rocky slopes.

Uses
Escallonia myrtilloides furnishes a reddish wood, with resistance to tension and shocks and easy drying. Because of this, it is useful for fences and woodcrafts.

The tree has an ornamental quality due to its distinctive crown shape, and is also used for hedges.

References

Trees of Peru
Trees of Costa Rica
Trees of Bolivia
Trees of Colombia
Trees of Ecuador
Trees of Venezuela
Trees of Panama
myrtilloides